Kilrain may refer to:

People
Jake Kilrain (1859–1937), ring name of boxer John Joseph Killion
Jake Kilrain (British boxer) (born 1914), ring name of boxer Henry Owens
Susan Kilrain (born 1961), American NASA astronaut

Fictional
Lee Kilrain, character in the 1947 film The Fabulous Texan
Dave Kilrain, character in the 1952 film Apache Country
Lt. Col. Kilrain, character in the 1953 film The Charge at Feather River
Lieutenant Kilrain, character in the 1957 film The Midnight Story
Sergeant Buster Kilrain, character in the 1974 novel The Killer Angels and the 1993 film Gettysburg that is based on it

Other
Kilrain, Thoroughbred horse, winner of the 1913 Wellington Cup
Canon of Kilrain, canon in the Church of Ireland held by Thomas Gibson